"" (also written "", Comorian for "The Union of the Great Islands"; also known as "", sometimes written "") is the national anthem of the Comoros. Adopted in 1978, it was written by Said Hachim Sidi Abderemane, who also composed the music with Kamildine Abdallah.

Mayotte (claimed by the Comoros but under French administration) is also mentioned in the song.

History
The anthem replaced a previous anthem titled "" ("Liberty"), also known as "" ("Four Comorian Islands"), adopted in 1976 under the Ali Soilih administration following a competition won by writer and musician Abou Chihabi. It was used until 1978, when a coup by Ahmed Abdallah and Bob Denard took place.

Lyrics

Notes

References

External links
Comoros: Udzima wa ya Masiwa - Audio of the national anthem of Comoros, with information and lyrics (archive link)
MIDI file

National anthems
Comorian music
National symbols of the Comoros
1978 songs
African anthems
National anthem compositions in F major